The Ministry of Defence is a Ministry of the Federal Government of Nigeria with the statutory responsibility of overseeing and supervising the Nigerian Armed Forces. The Ministry of Defence is headed by the Minister of Defence, a cabinet-level head who reports directly to the President of the Federal Republic of Nigeria. Beneath the Ministry of Defence are four subordinate military components: The Nigerian Defence Headquarters, the Nigerian Army, the Nigerian Navy and the Nigerian Air Force. Military operations and training are coordinated and managed by these components.

Its main mission is “To provide administrative and support services, timely and effectively to enable the Armed Forces of the Federal Republic of Nigeria to build and maintain a modern, compact, strong, professional, mission-capable and mission-ready Armed Forces, for the defence of National territory, maritime interest, airspace and the protection and defence of the constitution of the Federal Republic of Nigeria, and to contribute to peacemaking and peace-keeping duties worldwide under sub-regional and global organizations of which Nigeria is a member.”

History 
The Ministry of Defence came into being on 1 October 1958, when the War Office granted control of the armed forces to the national government - earlier discussions have made that made the establishment of Ministry of Defence. In 1956, at the time of the visit of Queen Elizabeth II, the Nigeria Regiment was renamed The Queen's Own Nigeria Regiment, Royal West African Frontier Force as a mark of allegiance to the Queen of the United Kingdom.  On 1 May 1958, the Naval Defence Force (NDF) was legally established as a force and re-designated Royal Nigerian Navy (RNN). On 1 June 1958, the British Army Council in London relinquished control of Nigerian Military Force (NMF) to the Nigerian Government. Upon its creation, the ministry was given responsibility over the two branches of the military in existence at that time the Royal Nigerian Army and the Royal Nigerian Navy and later oversaw the founding of the Nigerian Air Force in 1964.

Responsibilities 
The aims and objectives of the Ministry of Defence which are derived from the National Defence Policy are as follows:

 Maintaining men of the Nigerian Armed Forces in a state of combat readiness on land, sea and air. 
 Maintaining a proper balance in arms and men to meet the needs of internal and external security; 
 Making provision for the welfare of the men of the Armed Forces in terms of training, accommodation, health care and other benefits aimed at boosting their morale. 
 Enhancing the capability and sophistication of the country’s Defence Industries in order to reduce the country's dependence on foreign sources of supply. 
 Ensuring security in the African continent by the promotion of a collective defence system through bilateral, sub-regional and continental co-operation to ward off external aggression and to attain the African objective of the national foreign policy; and 
 Contributing towards peace and stability in the world as a whole through the United Nations, African Union (AU) and Economic Community of West African States (ECOWAS).

Organisation 
Headquartered at the Ship House in Abuja, Federal Capital Territory. The organizational structure of the Ministry is made up of the civilian and military components. The Minister of Defence, appointed by the President of Nigeria with the consent of the Senate, is the political head of the Ministry of Defence. The Minister is sometimes assisted by the Minister of State. The Permanent Secretary is the Accounting and Chief Administrative Officer of the Ministry. He coordinates and directs the activities of the Departments and Units in the Ministry.

Military organization 

The Armed Forces Services Headquarters of the Ministry comprise the following:
 Nigerian Defence Headquarters - Chief of the Defence Staff
 Nigerian Army Headquarters - Chief of Army Staff
 Nigerian Navy Headquarters - Chief of Naval Staff
 Nigerian Air Force Headquarters - Chief of Air Staff

The control of the Armed Forces, their joint operations and training rest with the Chief of Defence Staff Nigeria who coordinates the three Services while the three Service Chiefs are responsible for the day to day running of their respective Services.

Civilian organization 
The civilization cell are nine operational departments within the Ministry each headed by a Civilian director: 

 Joint Services
 Army Affairs
 Navy Affairs
 Air Force Affairs
 Human Resources
 Planning & Statistics
 Finance & Accounts
 Procurement and Legal Departments 

The civilian cell under the operational control of a civilian Director of the Nigerian Civil Service with others including:
 Human Resource Management Department
 Finance and Accounts Department
 Planning, Research and Statistics Department
 Procurement Department
 Legal Department
 Medical Services Department
 Education Department
 General Services Department
 Information and Public Relations Department
 Reforms Coordination and Services Improvement Department

Recently, the Office of the Director under the (Office of the Permanent Secretary) Special Duties was created to oversee the following units in the Ministry:

 Ministerial Servicom Unit
 Reform Unit
 Internal Audit
 Anti-Corruption and Transparency Unit
 Stock Verification Unit
 Protocol Unit
 Press and Public Relations Unit

Parastatals and agencies 
In addition, three agencies are subordinate to the Ministry of Defence: The Defence Mission, Defence Intelligence Agency (DIA) and the Defence Intelligence School. Other defence parastatals include the Military Pension Board (MPB), Nigerian Armed Forces Resettlement Centre (NAFRC) and the Defence Industries Corporation of Nigeria (DICON). The Ministry of Defence also supervises tri-service training institutions, including the National Defence College (NDC), Armed Forces Command and Staff College, Jaji (AFCSC), and the Nigerian Defence Academy (NDA).

List of ministers

References

External links 
 

Defence agencies of Nigeria
Federal Ministries of Nigeria
Nigeria
Military of Nigeria